Lusby is a village in the East Lindsey district of Lincolnshire, England.

History

The parish church is Grade I-listed and dedicated to St Peter. It is built in greenstone and dates from the 11th century, with 15th-century additions. It was further altered and reduced in 1893 by Ewan Christian, and in the 20th century an porch was added. A late 11th-early 12th-century grave marker is incorporated above the keystone of the blocked south doorway of the nave.

A scion of the parish was the Very Revd Dr Penyston Booth, Dean of Windsor, whose brother served as Rector till 1716.

Lusby CofE School was built as a National School to serve the village as well as nearby Winceby and Asgarby. It closed in 1962.

References

External links
 www.theclergydatabase.org.uk: Revd John Booth, Rector of Lusby (1698–1717)

Villages in Lincolnshire
East Lindsey District